Queen of the Seas is a 1961 adventure film  directed by Umberto Lenzi and starring Lisa Gastoni and Jerome Courtland.

Plot

Cast

 Lisa Gastoni as Mary Read
 Jerome Courtland as Peter Goodwin 
 Walter Barnes as Captain Poof 
 Agostino Salvietti as Mangiatrippa 
 Germano Longo as Ivan 
 Gianni Solaro as Governor of Florida
 Tullio Altamura as Don Pedro Alvarez 
  Gisella Arden as The French Dancer
 Dina De Santis as  Peter's Lover
 Ignazio Balsamo as Captain of the Guards
 Anna Arena as Lady in the Diligence
 Giulio Battiferri as Prison Guard 
 Edoardo Toniolo as Lord Goodwin 
 Piero Pastore as Master of Protocol 
 Loris Gizzi as The Director of the Prison
 Bruno Scipioni as Lord Stewart

Release
Queen of the Seas was released theatrically in Italy on December 1, 1961. It was released in the United States in 1964. It has received a home video release by Something Weird.

Reception
In a contemporary review, the Monthly Film Bulletin reviewed a 62 minute dubbed version under the title Hell Below Deck. The review described the film as a "spiritless pirate melodrama" and noted "poorly photographed settings" and the swordplay, intrigues, and love scenes are "all equally uninteresting."

References

Sources

External links

 

1960s historical adventure films
French historical adventure films
Italian historical adventure films
Pirate films
Films directed by Umberto Lenzi
Cultural depictions of Mary Read
Films with screenplays by Ernesto Gastaldi
Films with screenplays by Luciano Martino
1960s Italian films
1960s French films